Ye Qing (simplified Chinese: 叶青; traditional Chinese: 叶青; pinyin: Yè Qīng; born June 1966) is a Chinese businessman and politician. Ye is the CEO of Beijing Yeshi Enterprise Group Co., Ltd, current Standing Committee Member of the 12th Chinese People's Political Consultative Conference, Vice Chairman of the All-China Federation of Industry and Commerce, Deputy Director of the Standing Committee of the Chaoyang District People's Congress in Beijing, and Chairman of the Chaoyang District Federation of Industry and Commerce.

On October 24, 2018, he was included on a list of the "100 Outstanding Private Entrepreneurs in the 40 Years of Reform and Opening-up" by the United Front Work Department and the All-China Federation of Industry and Commerce.

Career 
Ye is a former Deputy Director of Beijing Mulin Garment Factory, and before politics was involved in the textiles business.

In October 2011, he was appointed a Member of the National Committee of the Chinese People's Political Consultative Conference, Member of the Standing Committee of the All-China Federation of Industry and Commerce, Deputy Chairman of the Beijing Municipal Federation of Industry and Commerce, Deputy Chairman of the Beijing Municipal Committee of the Democratic Construction Association, Chairman of the Chaoyang District Federation of Industry and Commerce, Chairman of the District Chamber of Commerce.

In January 2015, he was appointed Deputy Director of the Standing Committee of the Chaoyang District People's Congress in Beijing.

In November 2017, Ye was promoted to Vice Chairman of the All-China Federation of Industry and Commerce, the Deputy Director of the Standing Committee of the Chaoyang District People's Congress in Beijing, Chairman of the Chaoyang District Federation of Industry and Commerce.

References 

1966 births
Living people